The seventh season of CSI: Miami premiered on CBS on September 22, 2008 and ended May 18, 2009. The series stars David Caruso and Emily Procter.

Description 
As Calleigh struggles to hold the team together following Horatio's assassination, Ryan finds himself in the frame for the murder, but are bigger things at play during the seventh season of CSI: Miami? Follow Caine, Duquesne, and their team of elite investigators as they tackle burning bodies, bouncing checks, gang trials, conmen, distrust, dishonor, murder in the air, and murder on a reality television show. Also this season, Calleigh finds her life is at risk following her entering a burning building, whilst Eric finds his life is at risk after aiding and abetting his fugitive father, and Tara finds her career is at risk as she begins to struggle with a narcotics addiction.

Cast

Main cast 
 David Caruso as Horatio Caine; a CSI Lieutenant and the Director of the MDPD Crime Lab.
 Emily Procter as Calleigh Duquesne; a veteran CSI Detective, the CSI Assistant Supervisor and a ballistics expert.
 Adam Rodriguez as Eric Delko; a CSI Detective and Wolfe's partner.
 Jonathan Togo as Ryan Wolfe; a CSI Detective and Delko's partner.
 Rex Linn as Frank Tripp; a senior Robbery-Homicide Division (RHD) Detective assigned to assist the CSI's.
 Eva LaRue as Natalia Boa Vista; a CSI Detective. 
 Megalyn Echikunwoke as Tara Price; the teams Medical Examiner. (Episode 5-24)

Recurring cast 
Khandi Alexander as Alexx Woods; a physician.
Sofia Milos as Yelina Salas; a Private Investigator.
Johnny Whitworth as Jake Berkeley; an undercover MDPD Narcotics Detective.
Evan Ellingson as Kyle Harmon; Horatio's son.
Elizabeth Berkley as Julia Winston; Kyle's mother.
David Lee Smith as Rick Stetler; an IAB officer.

Episodes

References

07
2008 American television seasons
2009 American television seasons